{{DISPLAYTITLE:C11H13N3O}}
The molecular formula C11H13N3O (molar mass: 203.24 g/mol) may refer to:

 Ampyrone
 5-Carboxamidotryptamine
 Feprosidnine
 Sumanirole

Molecular formulas